Vaikom Vijayalakshmi (born 7 October 1981) is an Indian playback singer from Kerala, India. She is an expert in a rare musical instrument called Gayatriveena. She won special jury mention for her much appreciated work in the 2013 film Celluloid. She was born at Vaikom on 7 October 1981 and later on moved to Chennai. In 2022, she was honoured with Kerala Sree Award, third highest civilian award given by the Government of Kerala.

Personal life
She was born on 7 October 1981, on Vijayadashami. She got engaged to Bahrain-based technician Santhosh in December 2016, but she suddenly called off her wedding, citing that her fiancé insulted her for her blindness and requested her to stop stage shows. She was praised for her decision on social media. Vaikom Vijayalakshmi married N. Anoop, a mimicry artist on 22 October 2018 at Vaikom Sree Mahadeva Temple. They got divorced in June 2021.

Awards

 2012: Kerala State Film Award – Special Mention for "Kaatte Kaatte" from Celluloid
 2013: Kerala State Film Award for Best Singer for "Ottakku Padunna" from Nadan
 2013: Kerala Sangeetha Nataka Akademi Award (Light Music)
 2014: Filmfare Award for Best Female Playback Singer - Malayalam for "Ottakku Padunna" from Nadan
 2014: Mirchi Music Awards (South) for Upcoming Female Vocalist of the year for "Ottakku Padunna" from Nadan 
 2014: Nominated -  Asianet Film Awards for Best Playback Singer(Female)  -  "Ottakku Padunna" from Nadan
 2014: Jaycey Film Awards for Best Singer for "Ottakku Padunna" from Nadan 
 2014: Nominated - 3rd South Indian International Movie Awards for Best Female Playback Singer - "Ottakku Padunna" from Nadan
 2014: Eenam Swaralaya Awards for song of the year - "Ottakku Padunna" from Nadan
 2014: Nominated - Asiavision Awards for Best Singer(Female)-"Ottakku Padunna" from Nadan 
 2014: Nominated - Vijay Award for Best Singer(Female)-"Puthiya Uligai" from Yennamo Yedho 
 2014: C.K.M.A Malayalam film Awards for Best female singer
 2015: Nominated- Filmfare Award for Best Female Playback Singer - Malayalam for "Kaikkottum" from Oru Vadakkan Selfie
 2016: Won -Vanitha Film Award for Best Singer(Female)- "Kaikottum" from "Oru Vadakkan Selfie"
 2017: Honorary doctorate (D.Litt) from International Tamil University United States
 2022: Kerala Sree award instituted by Government of Kerala

Notable songs

Acted films
 2022 - Swami Saranam 
 2014 - Ezhudesangalkkumakale

References

External links

Living people
Malayalam playback singers
Actresses in Malayalam cinema
1981 births
Filmfare Awards South winners
Tamil playback singers
People from Vaikom
Indian women playback singers
21st-century Indian singers
Singers from Kerala
Film musicians from Kerala
Women Carnatic singers
Carnatic singers
21st-century Indian women singers
Blind musicians
Women musicians from Kerala
Kerala Sree Award Winners
Recipients of the Kerala Sangeetha Nataka Akademi Award